Francis Hong Yong-ho (born 12 October 1906 – death unknown, but acknowledged in June 2013) was a Roman Catholic prelate in North Korea who was imprisoned by the communist regime of Kim Il-sung in 1949 and later disappeared. After his disappearance, he was for many years listed as the Bishop of Pyongyang.

Biography
Born in Pyongyang on 12 October 1906, Francis Hong Yong-ho was ordained to the priesthood on 25 May 1933. Eleven years later, he was appointed the Vicar Apostolic of Heijō and Titular Bishop of Auzia by Pope Pius XII on 24 March 1944. His episcopal ordination took place on 29 June 1944, the principal consecrator being Bishop Bonifatius Sauer, O.S.B., with Bishops  and Paul Roh Ki-nam as co-consecrators.

He was imprisoned by the communist regime of Kim Il-sung in 1949 and later disappeared. According to Cardinal Nicolas Cheong Jin-suk, speaking in 2006:

The Vicariate Apostolic of Heijō changed its name to Pyongyang on 12 July 1950, which was elevated to the status of the Diocese of Pyongyang by Pope John XXIII on 10 March 1962, with Francis Hong Yong-ho named as the first bishop of the new diocese.

Disappearance
After being listed as the ordinary of Pyongyang by the Pontifical Yearbook for decades, with the specification that he was to be considered "missing", Hong Yong-ho's death was finally acknowledged by the Holy See in June 2013, although the actual date and place of death is unknown. This decision is connected to the fact that the Catholic Bishops' Conference of Korea have asked the Congregation for the Causes of Saints for the nihil obstat to open the cause of beatification of Bishop Hong.

See also 
List of people who disappeared

References

1906 births
Year of death unknown
Place of death unknown
1940s missing person cases
20th-century Roman Catholic bishops in Korea
Enforced disappearances in North Korea
Christian martyrs
Missing people
Missing person cases in Asia
North Korean prisoners and detainees
North Korean Roman Catholic bishops
People from Pyongyang
Prisoners and detainees of North Korea
Roman Catholic bishops of Pyongyang